Two Pieces for Piano may refer to:

 Two Pieces for Piano (1921, John Ireland)
 Two Pieces for Piano (1925, John Ireland)
 Two Pieces for Piano (1929–30, John Ireland)